Intervision is a brief orchestral work by Dmitri Shostakovich composed in 1971. It was commissioned by the Intervision Network, which broadcast its premiere on March 29, 1971, one day before the 24th Congress of the Communist Party of the Soviet Union. Because Shostakovich's Intervision was regularly used to preface broadcasts of foreign news items, the work became one of the composer's best-known in the final decades of the Soviet Union. It was published in volume 36 of the new complete works edition of the composer's music currently being published by DSCH Publishers. Shostakovich's manuscript, which contained portions of his transcription for voices and piano of his Symphony No. 14, was gifted by the composer to Boris Parsadanian. The manuscript is currently held in the Juilliard Manuscript Collection.

References

Dmitri Shostakovich
Compositions by Dmitri Shostakovich
1971 compositions